Vungu Rural District Council is a local government arm overseeing the Gweru Rural District. It was created in terms of the Zimbabwe Rural District Councils Act; Chapter 29.13. Its capital is Gweru in Zimbabwe.

Vungu Rural District Council is literally Gweru Rural District Council taking care of the rural district with Gweru Municipality taking care of the urban district. It comprises two parliamentary constituencies, Chiwundura (eight wards) and Vungu (eleven wards) while Gweru Municipality comprises Gweru Urban and Mkoba metropolitan constituencies.

Chiwundura is east of the Harare-Bulawayo Highway and Vungu is on the west side of the highway.

Ward Distribution

2013 - 2018 Councillors

Source: Zimbabwe Electoral Commission

2008-2023 Councillors

Source: Kubatana Aechive

See also

 Gweru District
 Zibagwe RDC 
 Takawira RDC
 Midlands Province

References

Populated places in Midlands Province